Hypopachus  is a genus of microhylid frogs (common name: sheep frogs) found in the Americas between Costa Rica and the southern United States. They can bury themselves under the ground or moss. Its name means ‘somewhat thick’, referring to its tough skin.

Species
The five species are:
Hypopachus barberi  – Barber's sheep frog
 Hypopachus guancasco  – Lenca sheep frog
Hypopachus pictiventris 
Hypopachus ustus 
Hypopachus variolosus  – sheep frog

References 

 
Frogs of North America
Amphibians of Central America
Amphibian genera
Microhylidae
Taxa named by Wilhelm Moritz Keferstein